James M. Fosgate (December 5, 1937 – December 9, 2022) was an American inventor, engineer and businessman. The self-taught son of a television and radio repairman, Fosgate invented the first car amplifier in 1973 and founded Fosgate Electronics, now called Rockford Fosgate. Since his departure from Rockford Fosgate in 1981, Fosgate has remained active in the audio world, running Fosgate Laboratories and leading the team that created Dolby Pro Logic II. Fosgate was also the developer of one of the finest quadraphonic decoders, the TATE II 101A (see Stereo Quadraphonic for details), in collaboration with Peter Scheiber and Martin Willcocks, which was superseded by his 3601 decoder.

Audio career
Collaborating with four channel matrix pioneer Peter Scheiber early on gave Fosgate's company the edge to become one of the leaders in the Dolby Surround market.

In 2003 Fosgate received an Emmy Award for the development of surround sound for television.

References

1937 births
2022 deaths
Businesspeople from Indianapolis
20th-century American inventors
American audio engineers